Uritu Mayu (Quechua uritu speaking parrot, mayu river, "speking parrot river", also spelled Orito Mayu) is a Bolivian river in the Chuquisaca Department, Jaime Zudáñez Province, Icla Municipality. It is a left affluent of the Pillku Mayu.

References

Rivers of Chuquisaca Department